White Hollow is a valley in Wayne County in the U.S. state of Missouri.

White Hollow has the name of Frank White, an early settler.

References

Valleys of Wayne County, Missouri
Valleys of Missouri